Debrecen International Airport  is the international airport of Debrecen in the Hajdú-Bihar County of Hungary. It is the second largest airport in Hungary, after Budapest and ahead of Hévíz–Balaton. Debrecen is the second largest city in Hungary, after Budapest and ahead of Szeged.

History

The history of Debrecen Airport goes back to the early 20th Century. The first official regular flight carrying mail took off in 1930. Subsequently, the Airport served sport and military purposes. From 1930, it had remarkable domestic traffic serving flights from Debrecen to Budapest and to other major cities in Hungary. During World War II it was the base of a Hungarian bombing squad.

Between 1946 and 1968, Debrecen Airport functioned also as an emergency airfield for Budapest Airport. Following World War II, the Soviet air force had control over the airport until 1990. The political transition brought the revival of the airport and international civilian traffic was launched together with sports aviation.

In May 1991, Soviet troops vacated the airport and handed it over to the Hungarian government. In 1994, the Debrecen Municipal Government realized the need to develop the airport and included it in its development plan. The city purchased the airport and has been steadily developing it.

By 2004, the city of Debrecen had invested 3.5 billion forints to purchase, operate, and continually develop Debrecen Airport.

On 18 June 2012, Wizz Air launched its scheduled service between Debrecen and London-Luton, initially with 3 weekly flights. In 2012–2013, Tatarstan Airlines operated a bi-weekly flight to Moscow-Domodedovo. After the disaster of Tatarstan Airlines Flight 363 which forced Tatarstan Airlines into bankruptcy, the route was taken over by UTair Aviation. In 2014, due to souring Russia–European Union relations, a number of punitive sanctions were implemented vice versa that forced UTair to cancel the flight.

In 2015, Wizz Air established a cadet pilot school at the airport under the company Pharma-Flight Kft which also researches and produces pharmaceutical products for flight staff. Wizz Air in 2015 announced they would base one Airbus A320 at Debrecen.

The construction of a new "innovation and incubation centre" at the airport which would host the new terminal on its ground floor began in June 2015. and scheduled to open in 2017.

Airlines and destinations

The following airlines operate regular year-round and seasonal services at the airport:

Statistics

Top destinations

Annual passenger numbers

Ground transportation

Bus

Buses Airport1 and Airport2 are operated by the local public transport company, called Debreceni Közlekedési Vállalat (DKV). Airport1 runs between the airport and the main train station of Debrecen, where connections are available to local, regional and international buses, trams and trains, while Airport2 runs between the Airport and the northern end of the city. The schedule of the buses are matched with the departure and arrival times of the planes at the airport, serving all inbound and outbound flights and can be used with any of the regular DKV tickets or passes.

A direct bus connection was established in March 2016 between Nagyvárad (Oradea) and Debrecen International Airport. The schedule is matched with the arrival and departure times of the planes.

Road
The street leading to the airport terminal is accessible from Route 47 only. Passengers arriving at the airport can get to their destinations by taxi for a fix tariff within city limits.

Train
The airport has a recently reconstructed direct rail connection, but it is used for freight moving only. It will be made suitable for passenger traffic only if there will be a reasonable demand for the construction sometime in the future.

See also
 List of airports in Hungary
 Transport in Hungary

Notes

References

External links

 Official website
 
 

Airports in Hungary
Debrecen
Soviet Air Force bases
Hungary–Soviet Union relations
Buildings and structures in Debrecen
Military installations of the Soviet Union in other countries